
Year 799 (DCCXCIX) was a common year starting on Tuesday (link will display the full calendar) of the Julian calendar. The denomination 799 for this year has been used since the early medieval period, when the Anno Domini calendar era became the prevalent method in Europe for naming years.

Events 
 By place 

 Europe 
 Autumn – Siege of Trsat: Višeslav, prince or duke of Dalmatian Croatia, decisively defeats an invading Frankish army under Eric of Friuli, during the siege at the fortress city of Trsat (Rijeka).

 Britain 
 King Eardwulf of Northumbria, worried about further rivals, has ealdorman Moll killed. Former king Osbald dies as an abbot in exile. He is buried in an unmarked grave in York Minster.

 By topic 

 Religion 
 April 25 – Pope Leo III is physically attacked by a band of aristocratic conspirators, under the leadership of a public official who is a nephew of the late Pope Adrian I. After mistreatment and attempted disfigurement by the citizens of Rome, Leo flees to the court of King Charlemagne at Paderborn (modern Germany) to seek protection. He sends him back with Frankish agents, and restores him to the papal throne.

Births 
 Jiang Shen, chancellor of the Tang Dynasty (d. 881)
 Langdarma, emperor of Tibet (approximate date)
 Zhang Yichao, Chinese general (approximate date)

Deaths 
 April 13 – Paul the Deacon, Lombard monk and  historian
 September 4 – Musa al-Kadhim, seventh Twelver Shī‘ah Imam (b. 745)
 Eric, duke of Friuli
 Gerold, Alamannian nobleman
 Huaisu, Chinese Buddhist monk (b. 737) 
 Osbald, king of Northumbria

References